Pavlice is a village and municipality of Trnava District in the Trnava region of Slovakia.

References

External links

https://web.archive.org/web/20080111223415/http://www.statistics.sk/mosmis/eng/run.html 

Villages and municipalities in Trnava District